The following lists events that happened during 1894 in Australia.

Incumbents

Premiers
Premier of New South Wales - George Dibbs (until 2 August) then George Reid
Premier of South Australia - Charles Kingston
Premier of Queensland - Hugh Nelson
Premier of Tasmania - Henry Dobson (until 14 April) then Edward Braddon
Premier of Western Australia - John Forrest
Premier of Victoria - James Patterson (until 27 September) then George Turner

Governors
Governor of New South Wales – Robert Duff 
Governor of Queensland – Henry Wylie Norman 
Governor of South Australia – Algernon Keith-Falconer, 9th Earl of Kintore 
Governor of Tasmania – Jenico Preston, 14th Viscount Gormanston
Governor of Victoria – John Hope, 1st Marquess of Linlithgow 
Governor of Western Australia – William C. F. Robinson

Events
 January - A cyclone hits the north west of Western Australia, killing approximately 50 persons
 28 June - A Colonial Conference, held in Ottawa, Ontario, Canada, resolves to lay a telegraph cable between Canada and Australia.
 22 October - Martha Needle is hanged in Melbourne Gaol for the poisoning of her husband, and three children, in an attempt to obtain money from insurance policies.
 10 November - Jandamarra, an Indigenous Australian of the Bunuba people, leads one of the few armed insurrections against Europeans.
 18 December - South Australia is the first colony to legislate women equal franchise with men, taking effect in 1895.
 The Australian Workers' Union is formed from the joining of the Amalgamated Shearers' Union of Australasia and the General Labourers' Union.

Arts and literature

 The novel Seven Little Australians is published by Ethel Turner

Sport
 Patron wins the Melbourne Cup
 South Australia wins the Sheffield Shield

Births
 23 February – Harold Horder (died 1978), rugby league footballer
 13 April – Arthur Fadden (died 1973), Prime Minister of Australia
 30 April – H.V. Evatt (died 1965), politician
 14 August – Frank Burge (died 1958), rugby league footballer
 25 August – Nick Winter (died 1955), athlete
 20 December – Robert Menzies (died 1978), Prime Minister of Australia

Deaths
 17 February - John Alexander MacPherson (born 1833), Premier of Victoria

References

 
Australia
Years of the 19th century in Australia